11th World Soundtrack Awards
October 22, 2011

Best Original Soundtrack:
 Inception 
The 11th World Soundtrack Awards were given out on 22 October 2011 in Ghent, Belgium.

Awards

Best Original Soundtrack
Inception by Hans Zimmer
The Social Network by Trent Reznor, Atticus Ross
Black Swan by Clint Mansell
The King's Speech by Alexandre Desplat
True Grit by Carter Burwell

Soundtrack Composer of the Year
Alexandre Desplat for The King's Speech, A Better Life, The Well-Digger's Daughter, Harry Potter and the Deathly Hallows – Part 2, Harry Potter and the Deathly Hallows – Part 1, The Burma Conspiracy and The Tree of Life
Patrick Doyle for Jig, La Ligne droite and Thor
Hans Zimmer for How Do You Know, Rango, Inception, Pirates of the Caribbean: On Stranger Tides, Kung Fu Panda 2, The Dilemma, Megamind
John Powell for Mars Needs Moms, Rio and Kung Fu Panda 2
Clint Mansell for Last Night, Black Swan and Faster

Best Original Song Written for a Film
Randy Newman for "We Belong Together" in Toy Story 3
Dido (lyrics/performer), Rollo Armstrong (lyrics), A. R. Rahman (music/performer) for "If I Rise" in 127 Hours
Gwyneth Paltrow (performer), Hillary Lindsey (music/lyric), Troy Verges (music/lyrics), Tom Douglas (music/lyrics), Bob DiPiero (music/lyrics) for "Coming Home" in Country Strong
Cher (performer), Diane Warren (music/lyrics) for "You Haven't Seen the Last of Me" in Burlesque
Alan Menken (music), Glenn Slater (music/lyrics), Mandy Moore (performer), Zachary Levi (performer) for "I See the Light" in Tangled

Discover of the Year
The First Grader, The Rite by Alex Heffes
Limitless by Paul Leonard-Morgan
Natural Selection, Hamill by iZLER
Hanna by Ed Simons, Tom Rowlands
X-Men: First Class and Gulliver's Travels by Henry Jackman

Public Choice Award
A. R. Rahman for 127 Hours

SABAM Award for Best Young European Composer
Gabriel-Heinrich Yden

Lifetime Achievement Award
Giorgio Moroder

External links

11th World Soundtrack Awards

2011
2011 film awards
2011 music awards